Megachile judaea is a species of bee in the family Megachilidae. It was described by Tkalcu in 1999.

References

Judaea
Insects described in 1999